The 1965 Masters Tournament was the 29th Masters Tournament, held April 8–11 at Augusta National Golf Club in Augusta, Georgia.

Jack Nicklaus, age 25, won the second of his six Masters titles with a score of 271 (−17), at the time a tournament record, three strokes better than Ben Hogan's 274 in 1953. It was equaled in 1976 by Raymond Floyd and surpassed in 1997 by Tiger Woods' 270 (−18). Nicklaus' winning margin of nine strokes also stood until 1997, when Woods was victorious by twelve strokes to win his first green jacket. It was the fourth of a record 18 major titles won by Nicklaus in his career.

The "Big Three" (Nicklaus, Arnold Palmer, and Gary Player) were tied for the lead after 36 holes at 138 (−6), but Nicklaus shot a 64 (−8) on Saturday to post a 202 (−14), a gain of five shots on Player and eight on Palmer. Nicklaus' round tied the course record set by Lloyd Mangrum in the first round in 1940; it was lowered to 63 by Nick Price in the third round in 1986.

Nicklaus totally over-powered the Augusta National course, hitting short-irons into most of the par four holes and mid-irons into many of the par five holes, especially during his record-tying third round 64. After the tournament was over, when asked about Nicklaus' performance that week Bobby Jones said, "He plays a game with which I am not familiar."

Byron Nelson, age 53, tied for fifteenth place, the last cut made at Augusta by the two-time champion.

Art Wall Jr. won the sixth Par 3 contest with a score of 20.

Field
1. Masters champions
Jack Burke Jr. (4), Jimmy Demaret, Doug Ford (4), Ralph Guldahl, Claude Harmon, Ben Hogan (8), Herman Keiser, Cary Middlecoff (2), Byron Nelson, Jack Nicklaus (2,4,8,10), Arnold Palmer (2,3,8,9,10,11), Henry Picard, Gary Player (3,4,8), Gene Sarazen, Sam Snead, Art Wall Jr.
Craig Wood did not play.

The following categories only apply to Americans

2. U.S. Open champions (last 10 years)
Tommy Bolt, Julius Boros (11), Billy Casper (8,9,11), Jack Fleck, Gene Littler (8,9,11), Dick Mayer, Ken Venturi (9,10)

3. The Open champions (last 10 years)
Tony Lema (8,11)

4. PGA champions (last 10 years)
Jerry Barber, Dow Finsterwald (8,9,11), Jay Hebert, Lionel Hebert, Bobby Nichols (9,10), Bob Rosburg (9)

5. U.S. Amateur and Amateur champions (last 10 years)
Deane Beman (6,a), William C. Campbell (7,a), Charles Coe (6,a), Richard Davies (6,a)

Harvie Ward did not play. Other champions forfeited their exemptions by turning professional.

6. Members of the 1963 U.S. Walker Cup team
Robert W. Gardner (a), Downing Gray (a), Billy Joe Patton (a), Charlie Smith (7,a), Ed Updegraff (a)

Labron Harris Jr. and R. H. Sikes forfeited their exemptions by turning professional.

7. 1964 U.S. Amateur quarter-finalists
Don Allen (a), Dave Eichelberger (a), Gene Ferrell (a), John Mark Hopkins (a), Dale Morey (a), Ed Tutwiler (a)

8. Top 24 players and ties from the 1964 Masters Tournament
Jim Ferrier, Al Geiberger (9), Paul Harney, Don January (9), Dave Marr, Billy Maxwell (11), Johnny Pott (9,11), Mason Rudolph (10), Dan Sikes, Mike Souchak, Bo Wininger (10)

9. Top 16 players and ties from the 1964 U.S. Open
George Bayer, Gay Brewer (10), Bill Collins, Terry Dill, Raymond Floyd, Ed Furgol, Tommy Jacobs

10. Top eight players and ties from 1964 PGA Championship
Tom Nieporte

11. Members of the U.S. 1963 Ryder Cup team
Bob Goalby, Dave Ragan

12. Two players selected for meritorious records on the fall part of the 1964 PGA Tour
Frank Beard, Jack McGowan

13. One player, either amateur or professional, not already qualified, selected by a ballot of ex-Masters champions
Wes Ellis

14. One professional, not already qualified, selected by a ballot of ex-U.S. Open champions
Tommy Aaron

15. One amateur, not already qualified, selected by a ballot of ex-U.S. Amateur champions
Bill Hyndman (a)

16. Two players, not already qualified, from a points list based on finishes in the winter part of the 1965 PGA Tour
Doug Sanders, Bert Weaver

17. Foreign invitations
Peter Butler (8), Bob Charles (3,9), Chen Ching-Po, Gary Cowan (a), Bruce Crampton (8,9), Bruce Devlin (8), Harold Henning, Bernard Hunt, Geoffrey Hunt, Tomoo Ishii, George Knudson, Cobie Legrange, Stan Leonard, Kel Nagle (3,8), Chi-Chi Rodríguez (8), Leopoldo Ruiz, Ramón Sota, Nick Weslock (a)

Numbers in brackets indicate categories that the player would have qualified under had they been American.

Round summaries

First round
Thursday, April 8, 1965

Source:

Second round
Friday, April 9, 1965

Source:

Third round
Saturday, April 10, 1965

Source:

Scorecard
Third round, ties course record   31-33=64 (−8)

Final round
Sunday, April 11, 1965

Final leaderboard

Sources:

Scorecard

Cumulative tournament scores, relative to par

References

External links
Masters.com – past winners and results
GolfCompendium.com – 1965 Masters
Augusta.com – 1965 Masters leaderboard and scorecards

1965
1965 in golf
1965 in American sports
1965 in sports in Georgia (U.S. state)
April 1965 sports events in the United States